Lee Han-im (also known as Lee Han-lim, born 20 March 1969) is a South Korean windsurfer. He competed in the men's Division II event at the 1988 Summer Olympics.

References

External links
 
 

1969 births
Living people
South Korean windsurfers
South Korean male sailors (sport)
Olympic sailors of South Korea
Sailors at the 1988 Summer Olympics – Division II
Place of birth missing (living people)